Domenico of Arras was a Pre-congregational saint and Bishop of Arras, France from 540AD to about 545AD. His feast day is 6th Feb.

References

Bishops of Arras
Roman Catholic monks
Year of birth unknown